Luyolo Dapula (born ) is a South African rugby union player for the  in the Currie Cup. His regular position is flanker.

References

South African rugby union players
Living people
1998 births
Rugby union flankers
Southern Kings players
Free State Cheetahs players
Griquas (rugby union) players